Lauric acid, systematically dodecanoic acid, is a saturated fatty acid with a 12-carbon atom chain, thus having many properties of medium-chain fatty acids. It is a bright white, powdery solid with a faint odor of bay oil or soap. The salts and esters of lauric acid are known as laurates.

Occurrence
Lauric acid, as a component of triglycerides, comprises about half of the fatty-acid content in coconut milk, coconut oil, laurel oil, and  palm kernel oil (not to be confused with palm oil), Otherwise, it is relatively uncommon. It is also found in human breast milk (6.2% of total fat), cow's milk (2.9%), and goat's milk (3.1%).

In various plants
The palm tree Attalea speciosa, a species popularly known in Brazil as babassu –  50% in babassu oil
Attalea cohune, the cohune palm (also rain tree, American oil palm, corozo palm or manaca palm) – 46.5% in cohune oil
Astrocaryum murumuru (Arecaceae) a palm native to the Amazon – 47.5% in "murumuru butter"
Coconut oil 49% 
Pycnanthus kombo (African nutmeg)
Virola surinamensis (wild nutmeg) 7.8–11.5%
Peach palm seed 10.4%
Betel nut 9%
Date palm seed 0.56–5.4%
Macadamia nut 0.072–1.1%
Plum 0.35–0.38%
Watermelon seed 0.33%
Viburnum opulus  0.24-0.33%
Citrullus lanatus (egusi melon)
Pumpkin flower 205 ppm, pumpkin seed 472 ppm

In Insects
Black soldier fly Hermetia illucens 30–50 mg/100 mg fat.

Uses
Like many other fatty acids, lauric acid is inexpensive, has a long shelf-life, is nontoxic, and is safe to handle. It is used mainly for the production of soaps and cosmetics.  For these purposes, lauric acid is reacted with sodium hydroxide to give sodium laurate, which is a soap.  Most commonly, sodium laurate is obtained by saponification of various oils, such as coconut oil.  These precursors give mixtures of sodium laurate and other soaps.

Lauric acid is a precursor to dilauroyl peroxide, a common initiator of polymerizations.

Nutritional and medical aspects
Although 95% of medium-chain triglycerides are absorbed through the portal vein, only 25–30% of lauric acid is absorbed through it.

Lauric acid increases total serum lipoproteins more than many other fatty acids, but mostly high-density lipoprotein (HDL). As a result, lauric acid has been characterized as having "a more favorable effect on total HDL than any other fatty acid [examined], either saturated or unsaturated". In general, a lower total/HDL serum lipoprotein ratio correlates with a decrease in atherosclerotic incidence.  Nonetheless, an extensive meta-analysis on foods affecting the total LDL/serum lipoprotein ratio found in 2003 that the net effects of lauric acid on coronary artery disease outcomes remained uncertain. A 2016 review of coconut oil (which is nearly half lauric acid) was similarly inconclusive about the effects on cardiovascular disease incidence.

References

Further reading
 Berner, Louise A. (1993). Defining the Role of Milkfat in Balanced Diets. In John E. Kinsella (Ed.) Advances in Food and Nutrition Research – Volume 37. Academic Press. pp. 159–166. .
 Kabara, Jon J. (1978). The Pharmacological Effect of Lipids. Champaign IL: American Oil Chemist's Society. .
 Kabara, Jon J. (2008). Fats Are Good for You and Other Secrets – How Saturated Fat and Cholesterol Actually Benefit the Body. North Atlantic Books. .

External links

 Lauric acid MS Spectrum

Fatty acids
Nutrition
Palm oil
Laurates
Alkanoic acids